FC Lokomotyv Kharkiv was a football club from Kharkiv.

History
The club entered official Soviet competitions in 1936 Soviet Cup as Lokomotiv Kharkov. It was formed out of the team Krasnyi Zheleznodorozhnik (Red Rail Worker) that existed in Kharkiv since 1923.

In league competitions the team appeared in 1938 playing in the first group of the Ukrainian SSR championship and replacing "Stalinets" team that represented electric-mechanical factory.

After the World War II, in 1945 the team was admitted to the Soviet second tier competitions known as "Vtoraya Gruppa" (Second Group) along with two other teams from the Ukrainian SSR, Kharchovyk Odesa (today Chornomorets) and Shakhtar Stalino.

Lokomotyv was a participant of the Soviet Top League and sometimes is erroneously considered as a direct predecessor of Metalist Kharkiv.

In 1956 the club was replaced by Avanhard Kharkiv (Metalist Kharkiv) and dissolved.

League history

Awards
Soviet second tier
Winner (2): 1948 (Vtoraya Gruppa), 1952 (Class B)
Cup of the Ukrainian SSR
Winner (1): 1945
Finalist (2): 1944, 1946

See also
 MFC Lokomotyv Kharkiv, a futsal club

External links
 All matches of the club.

 
Defunct football clubs in the Soviet Union
Defunct football clubs in Ukraine
Association football clubs established in 1923
Association football clubs disestablished in 1955
1923 establishments in Ukraine
1955 disestablishments in Ukraine
Lokomotyv Kharkiv
Soviet Top League clubs
Kharkiv
Lokomotiv (sports society)
Southern Railways (Ukraine)